Dom Carlos I (28 September 1863 – 1 February 1908), known as the Diplomat, the Martyr, and the Oceanographer, among many other names, was King of Portugal from 1889 until his assassination in 1908. He was the first Portuguese king to die a violent death since King Sebastian in 1578.

Early life

Carlos was born in Lisbon, Portugal, the son of King Luís and Queen Maria Pia, daughter of King Victor Emmanuel II of Italy, and was a member of the House of Braganza. He had a brother, Infante Afonso, Duke of Porto. He was baptised with the names Carlos Fernando Luís Maria Víctor Miguel Rafael Gabriel Gonzaga Xavier Francisco de Assis José Simão.

He had an intense education and was prepared to rule as a constitutional monarch. In 1883, he traveled to Italy, the United Kingdom, France and Germany, where he increased his knowledge of the modern civilization of his time. In 1883, 1886 and 1888, he ruled as Regent as his father was traveling in Europe, as had become traditional among the Portuguese constitutional kings. His father Luis I advised him to be modest and to study with focus.

His first bridal candidate was one of the daughters of German Emperor Frederick III, but the issue of religion presented an insurmountable problem, and diplomatic pressure from the British government prevented the marriage. He then met and married Princess Amélie of Orléans, eldest daughter of Philippe, comte de Paris, pretender to the throne of France.

Reign

Carlos became king on 19 October 1889. After the 1890 British Ultimatum, a series of treaties were signed with the United Kingdom. One signed in August 1890 defined colonial borders along the Zambezi and Congo rivers, whereas another signed on 14 October 1899 confirmed colonial treaties dating back to the 17th century. These treaties stabilised the political balance in Africa, ending Portuguese claims of sovereignty on the Pink Map, a geographical conception of how Portuguese colonies would appear on a map if the territory between the coastal colonies of Angola and Mozambique could be connected with territory in central Africa. These central African territories became part of the British Empire with the Portuguese concession becoming a source of national resentment in the country.

Domestically, Portugal declared bankruptcy twice – on 14 June 1892, then again on 10 May 1902 – causing industrial disturbances, socialist and republican antagonism and press criticism of the monarchy. Carlos responded by appointing João Franco as prime minister and subsequently accepting parliament's dissolution.

As a patron of science and the arts, King Carlos took an active part in the celebration of the 500th anniversary of the birth of Prince Henry the Navigator in 1894. The following year he decorated the Portuguese poet João de Deus in a ceremony in Lisbon.

Carlos took a personal interest in deep-sea and maritime exploration and used several yachts named Amélia on his oceanographical voyages.  He published an account of his own studies in this area.

Assassination

On 1 February 1908, the royal family was returning to Lisbon from the Ducal Palace of Vila Viçosa in Alentejo, where they had spent part of the hunting season during the winter.  They traveled by train to Barreiro and, from there, they took a steamer to cross the Tagus River and disembarked at Cais do Sodré in central Lisbon.  On their way to the royal palace, the open carriage with Carlos I and his family passed through the Terreiro do Paço fronting on the river.  In spite of recent political unrest there was no military escort.  While they were crossing the square at dusk, shots were fired from amongst the sparse crowd by two republican activists: Alfredo Luís da Costa and Manuel Buíça.

Buíça, a former army sergeant and sharpshooter, fired five shots from a rifle hidden under his long overcoat.  The king died immediately, his heir Luís Filipe was mortally wounded, and Prince Manuel was hit in the arm. The queen alone escaped injury.  The two assassins were killed on the spot by police; an innocent bystander, João da Costa, was also shot dead in the confusion.  The royal carriage turned into the nearby Navy Arsenal, where, about twenty minutes later, Prince Luís Filipe died.  Several days later, the younger son, Prince Manuel, was proclaimed king of Portugal.  He was to be the last of the Braganza-Saxe-Coburg and Gotha dynasty and the final king of Portugal.

Marriage and children

Carlos I was married to Princess Amélie of Orléans in 1886. She was a daughter of Philippe, Count of Paris, and Princess Marie Isabelle of Orléans. Their children were:
 Luís Filipe, Prince Royal of Portugal (1887–1908)
 Infanta Maria Ana of Braganza (b/d December 14, 1887)
 Manuel II, King of Portugal between 1908 and 1910 (1889–1932)

A woman known as Maria Pia of Saxe-Coburg and Braganza claimed to be the illegitimate daughter of King Carlos I of Portugal with Maria Amélia Laredó e Murça. Maria Pia claimed that King Carlos I legitimized her through a royal decree and placed her in the line of succession with the same rights and honours as the legitimately-born princes of Portugal; however, no undisputed evidence was presented to demonstrate this, and the king did not, constitutionally, have the personal authority to do so. Maria Pia's paternity was never proven and her claim not widely accepted.

Honours
Portuguese
 Grand Commander of the Three Military Orders of Christ, Aviz and St. James
 Grand Cross of the Tower and Sword
 Grand Cross of the Immaculate Conception of Vila Viçosa

Foreign

Ancestry

Citations

General references
 Jean Pailler: D. Carlos I – Rei de Portugal: Destino Maldito de um Rei Sacrificado. Bertrand, Lisbon, 2001, 
 Jean Pailler: Maria Pia: A Mulher que Queria Ser Rainha de Portugal. Bertrand, Lisbon, 2006, 
 Manuel Amaral: Portugal – Dicionário Histórico, Corográfico, Heráldico, Biográfico, Bibliográfico, Numismático e Artístico, Volume II, 1904–1915, págs. 759
 Rui Ramos: D. Carlos, Temas e Debates, Lisbon, 2007.

|-

|-

1863 births
1908 murders in Portugal
1908 deaths
19th-century Portuguese monarchs
20th-century murdered monarchs
20th-century Portuguese monarchs
Assassinated Portuguese people
Assassinated royalty
Burials at the Monastery of São Vicente de Fora
Deaths by firearm in Portugal
Dukes of Braganza
Extra Knights Companion of the Garter
3
3
3
Grand Crosses of the Order of Saint Stephen of Hungary
House of Braganza-Saxe-Coburg and Gotha
Knights Grand Cross of the Order of the Immaculate Conception of Vila Viçosa
Knights of the Golden Fleece of Spain
Knights of the Holy Sepulchre
Oceanographers
People from Lisbon
People murdered in Portugal
Portuguese people of Italian descent
Portuguese royalty
Princes Royal of Portugal
Recipients of the Order of St. Anna, 1st class
Recipients of the Order of the White Eagle (Russia)